Damodaran is a surname. Notable people with the surname include:

Aswath Damodaran, Professor of Finance at the Stern School of Business at New York University
Damodaran M. Vasudevan, Dean of the College of Medicine at Amrita Vishwa Vidyapeetham
K. Damodaran (1912–1976), Marxist and founder leader of the Communist Party in Kerala, India
Kaithapram Damodaran Namboothiri, lyricist, music director, actor, singer, screenwriter, performer of Carnatic music
M. Damodaran, thought leader, business executive and former government official
N. K. Damodaran (1909–1996), writer and translator of Kerala, India
Nettur P. Damodaran (1913–1978), member of the 1st Lok Sabha (1952) from the constituency of Tellicherry
S. Damodaran, Indian politician, Member of the Legislative Assembly of Tamil Nadu
T. Damodaran (born 1935), screenwriter of Malayalam cinema

See also
Damodar
Damodara
Damodarkati
Demodara

Indian surnames